Ghuleh-ye Olya (also Romanized as Ghūleh-ye ‘Olyā and Ghūleh ‘Olyā; also known as Ghūleh-ye Bālā) is a village in Soviren Rural District, Cham Khalaf-e Isa District, Hendijan County, Khuzestan Province, Iran. At the 2006 census, its population was 51, in 10 families.

References 

Populated places in Hendijan County